Dr James Powrie of Reswallie FRSE FGS (1815–1895) was a 19th-century Scottish geologist, palaeontologist and astronomer. He amassed a major collection of fossils during his lifetime.

Life
He was born at Reswallie House in Angus in 1814/15 the son of William Powrie (1770–1845), a Dundee merchant and manufacturer with premises at East Chapelshade (sic). Powrie Lane in Dundee appears to be named after him. His brother Thomas Powrie appears to have run the family business in the 1830s.

James studied science at St Andrews University, graduating MA around 1835. In 1845 he inherited his father's business in Dundee and the Reswallie estate.

In 1865 he was elected a Fellow of the Royal Society of Edinburgh. His proposer was David Page.

In 1868/9 he was president of the Edinburgh Geological Society. He regularly corresponded with the botanist George Gordon, Charles William Peach, Sir Edwin Lankester and Henry Woodward.

He died of a heart attack on 25 May 1895. He is buried in the family plot at Rescobie churchyard near Forfar.

A number of his fossils were donated to the Forfar Museum and the Royal Scottish Museum.

Publications

The Fishes of the Old Red Sandstone (1868)

Family

He was married to Mary Dickson (died 1903).

They had a son Thomas Powrie (1843–1933) and daughter Isabella Powrie (died 1939).

References

1815 births
1895 deaths
Alumni of the University of St Andrews
Scottish geologists
Fellows of the Royal Society of Edinburgh